Sheikh Sultan bin Zayed bin Khalifa Al Nahyan was the ruler of the Emirate of Abu Dhabi, from 1922 to 1926. His two sons, Shakbut and Zayed ruled Abu Dhabi for seventy six years (from 1928 to 2004). 

He killed his brother Hamdan in 1922 to rule Abu Dhabi, but was himself toppled and killed by another brother Saqr in 1926.

Children
He had at least four sons, the eldest of whom was Shakbut, and the youngest of whom was Zayed, also called Zayed II.

References

Year of birth missing
1926 deaths
Sheikhs of Abu Dhabi
House of Al Nahyan
Fratricides
20th-century Arabs